Analytica may refer to:

 Analytica (company), a Washington, D.C.-based consulting and information technology firm
 Analytica Corporation, developer of Borland Reflex
 Analytica (software), computer software for quantitative decision models
 Analytica (trade fair), a trade fair for laboratory technology, analysis and biotechnology 
 Analytica Chimica Acta, a scientific journal
 Analytica Priora, Aristotle 's work on deductive reasoning
 Oxford Analytica, an international consulting firm